Imazato Station may refer to:
Imazato Station (Kintetsu) on the Kintetsu Osaka Line in Ikuno-ku, Osaka, Japan.
Imazato Station (Osaka Metro) on the Osaka Metro Sennichimae Line and the Imazatosuji Line in Higashinari-ku, Osaka, Japan.